Trat province, also spelt Trad province, is one of seventy-seven provinces (changwat) located in eastern Thailand the easternmost region along the Thai coast. It has borders with Chanthaburi province to the northwest, Cambodia to the east, and the Gulf of Thailand to the south. Trat is 315 km from Bangkok.

Trat is known for gemstone mining and trading.

Toponymy
Trat is believed to be a corruption of "Krat"(กราด) the Thai name for the tree Dipterocarpus intricatus, common to the region and used to make brooms. It is also spelt Trad.

History
The history of Trat can be traced back to the early 17th century during the reign of King Prasat Thong of the Ayutthaya Kingdom. Formerly known as Mueang Thung Yai, Trat has played an important role in the development of the country's stability and economy due to its strategic location. The town of Trat later become a community of Chinese merchants.

After the fall of Ayutthaya to the Burmese in 1767, Trat served as a checkpoint and buffer city and was responsible for providing provisions to King Taksin the Great before he moved his forces from Chanthaburi to Ayutthaya. King Taksin then succeeded in driving out the Burmese invaders and liberated the kingdom from foreign rule.

In the Rattanakosin era, during the 1893 Paknam crisis, French troops landed and occupied the western part of Chantaburi province. In 1904, Siam was forced to surrender Trat to French Indochina to regain Chantaburi. Three years later, however, finding that Trat with its almost entirely Thai population was hard to rule, the French returned Trat to Thailand on 23 March 1907, in exchange for larger areas along the Mekong river, which included Battambang, Siam Nakhon, and Sisophon, which all have a Khmer majority population.

During the French-Thai War of 1940–1941, the Vichy French navy sailed from Saigon to seize Trat. The unprepared Thai warships were caught by surprise. By the end of the 17 January 1941 Battle of Ko Chang, three Thai ships had been left sinking: the HTMS Chonburi, HTMS Songkhla, and HTMS Thonburi. French casualties were light with no ships lost. The Japanese government negotiated a truce, which ended the conflict without further fighting.

When the Vietnamese pushed the Khmer Rouge out of Cambodia in 1985, Pol Pot fled to Thailand and made his headquarters in a plantation villa near Trat. It was built for him by the Thai Army and nicknamed "Office 87".

Geography

The Cardamom mountain range forms the boundary to Cambodia in the east of the province, where Trat has borders with three Cambodian provinces: Battambang, Pursat, and Koh Kong.

The third biggest island of Thailand is the province's Ko Chang (after Phuket and Ko Samui). The island and more than 40 surrounding smaller islands form the Mu Ko Chang Marine National Park.

Other islands of the province include Ko Kham, Ko Mak, and Ko Phi.

National parks
There are two national parks, along with five other national parks, make up region 2 (Si Racha) of Thailand's protected areas. 
 Mu Ko Chang National Park, 
 Namtok Khlong Kaeo National Park,

Climate
Most of Thailand receives from 1,200 to 1,600 mm of precipitation per year. Two provinces, Trat and Ranong, receive more than 4,500 mm a year making them the wettest places in the country.

Symbols
The provincial seal shows the sea with the Khao Banthat mountain range in the background.

The provincial tree is the tropical almond (Terminalia catappa).

Administration

Provincial government
The province is divided into seven districts (amphoes). These are further divided into 38 subdistricts (tambons) and 261 villages (mubans).
Mueang Trat /məʊŋtrɑt/
Khlong Yai /klɔŋjɑɪ/
Khao Saming /kăo-sà-mĭŋ/
Bo Rai bɔː rɑɪ/
Laem Ngop /læmŋɔːb/
Ko Kut gɔguːd/
Ko Chang /gɔtʃɑːŋ/

Local government
As of 26 November 2019 there are: one Trat Provincial Administration Organisation and 14 municipal (thesaban) areas in the province. Trat has town (thesaban mueang) status. Further 13 subdistrict municipalities (thesaban tambon). The non-municipal areas are administered by 29 Subdistrict Administrative Organisations – SAO (ongkan borihan suan tambon).

Transport

Air
Trat is served by Trat Airport, built and operated by Bangkok Airways.

Human achievement index 2017

Since 2003, United Nations Development Programme (UNDP) in Thailand has tracked progress on human development at sub-national level using the Human achievement index (HAI), a composite index covering all the eight key areas of human development. National Economic and Social Development Board (NESDB) has taken over this task since 2017.

Gallery

References

Further reading

External links

Trat provincial map, coat of arms and postal stamp

 
Provinces of Thailand
Gulf of Thailand